Andrew Utting (born 9 September 1977) is an Australian former professional baseball player.

Career
In 2007, he was part of the Australian Olympic baseball team that won a silver medal in the baseball tournament at the Athens Olympics. He studied biomedical science at Bond University. He played for Tokushima Indigo Socks in Japan's Shikoku-Kyūshū Island League.

External links

Bond University profile

1977 births
Living people
Australian expatriate baseball players in Japan
Australian expatriate baseball players in the United States
Baseball catchers
Baseball first basemen
Baseball players at the 2004 Summer Olympics
Bluefield Orioles players
Bond University alumni
Bowie Baysox players
Cook County Cheetahs players
Frederick Keys players
Gulf Coast Orioles players
Medalists at the 2004 Summer Olympics
Olympic baseball players of Australia
Olympic medalists in baseball
Olympic silver medalists for Australia
Rochester Red Wings players
Sportsmen from Victoria (Australia)